The 2021 PGA Tour Canada, titled as the 2021 Mackenzie Tour – PGA Tour Canada for sponsorship reasons and commonly known as the Canadian Tour, was a series of professional golf tournaments held in Canada during 2021. Eight tournaments were announced in June 2021 with total prize money of C$700,000. Players were not be able to earn promotion to the Korn Ferry Tour.

Forme Tour
In response to COVID-19 pandemic related restrictions on travel between the United States and Canada, the Forme Tour was created by the PGA Tour in 2021 in order to provide competition for non-Canadian PGA Tour Canada members. The tour consisted of eight tournaments in the United States, held between June and September. The tournaments offered Official World Golf Ranking points, and the top five players in the Order of Merit at the end of the season earned Korn Ferry Tour membership for the 2022 season.

Schedule
The following table lists official events during the 2021 season.

Order of Merit
The Order of Merit was titled as the Points List and was based on prize money won during the season, calculated using a points-based system. The top five players on the tour earned status to play on the 2022 PGA Tour Canada.

Notes

References

External links

PGA Tour Canada
PGA Tour Canada